The Golden Scarab is the debut studio album by former Doors member Ray Manzarek as a solo artist. It was recorded in 1973 and released in 1974 on the Mercury label, one year after the Doors breakup (at that time a trio formed of the surviving members of the band, more specifically Manzarek himself, Robby Krieger, and John Densmore).

Reception 

Joe Viglione of AllMusic gave The Golden Scarab a rating of three out of five stars. He considered it to be the "best embodiment of the Doors by one of the three surviving members", concluding:

In contrast, Uncut magazine wrote a scathing review, ridiculing, "It sucks... Even Jim at his dumbest, stinkiest drunk would have pissed himself laughing."

Track listing 
All tracks composed by Ray Manzarek except where indicated:

CD Bonus tracks 
 "Whirling Dervish" (Manzarek, Paul Davis) *
 "I Wake Up Screaming" (Manzarek, Danny Sugerman) *
 "Bicentennial Blues (Love It or Leave It)" *

Bonus tracks taken from Manzarek's 1974 LP The Whole Thing Started with Rock & Roll Now It's Out of Control.

Personnel
Ray Manzarek – lead vocals, keyboards, piano, organ, synthesizer, kalimba 
Larry Carlton – guitar
Tony Williams – drums
Oscar Brashear – trumpet
Mayuto Correa – wood block, bongos, congas
Milt Holland – pandeiro, cabasa, quica, African cowbell
Jerry Scheff – bass
Ernie Watts – tenor saxophone
George Bohanon – trombone
Steve Forman – tuned cowbells, whistles, guiro, tuned wood blocks
Patti Smith – vocals on "I Wake Up Screaming"

References 

Ray Manzarek albums
1974 debut albums
Albums produced by Bruce Botnick
Mercury Records albums
Albums recorded at Sunset Sound Recorders